The  is an electric multiple unit (EMU) train type operated in Japan between 1982 and 2011 by Japanese National Railways (JNR) and later by East Japan Railway Company (JR East), and currently operated by KAI Commuter and Philippine National Railways.

Formation
The sets were formed as follows.

Cars 3, 6, and 9 were each fitted with one PS21 pantograph.

Interior

History and operations
The 203 series sets were made to replace the 103-1000 series EMUs in 1982. The 203 series EMUs were on through services between the Joban Line and Tokyo Metro Chiyoda Line.

Withdrawal
The trains were gradually replaced by new E233-2000 series EMUs, and the last set ran in revenue service on 26 September 2011.

Overseas operations

Indonesia
Five former 203 series ten-car sets (Set numbers 51, 52, 66, 68, 69) were shipped to KAI Commuter in Jakarta, Indonesia in 2011. The trainsets were subsequently reformed to create four trainsets formed as one eight-car set (set 108), two ten-car sets (sets 106 and 109), and one twelve-car set (set 2). One ten-car set, set 109, has 5+5 formation with two middle driving trailers which are used only during regular maintenance.

Philippines
In November 2011, four former 203 series 10-car sets (set numbers 53, 54, 55, 67) were shipped to the Philippine National Railways (PNR) in the Philippines for Metro commuter service in Metro Manila, replacing former Japanese 12 and 14 series coaches. As of October 2013, seven four-car sets had been formed, as shown below, with car "A" at the Alabang end. Due to the lack of electrification in the PNR line, the units are equipped with a diesel-powered generator at the head car to provide power for the doors, lighting, and air-conditioning. They were usually hauled by 900 class locomotives for commuter service. The 2500 class and the 5000 class locomotives shunts the 203 series EMU in Tutuban for refueling.

In 2014, PNR started to operate the EMUs in 5-car configuration. As of December 2018, there are five sets in operation. Set 02 is the only 203 series EMU in 4 car formation until 2015.

EMUs 3, 4 and 7 were divided among the other EMUs to form the 5 sets, and their remnants are stored as reserve units or source of spare parts.
 

By April 2019, the head car of EMU 06 (KuHa 202-3) was transferred to EMU 02. By May 2019, the lead car of EMU 01 (KuHa 203-107) was replaced by EMU 04's head car (KuHa 203-4) and by July, EMU 07's lead car (KuHa 202-107) was transferred to EMU 08.

Due to aging reasons, the air-conditioning units of the 203 series bogged down. PNR conducted a bidding for the procurement of ten air-conditioning units for the 203 series from August to September 2018. PT INKA passed the bidding process, but after post-qualification the lone bidder was post-disqualified, causing a failed bidding. Again, a second bidding was conducted in December 2018. PT INKA once again participated, and passed the bidding process. The company passed the post-qualification process and was subsequently awarded the contract in February 2019. Replacement of air-conditioning units was conducted in February 2020, with the new Model ACI-4202 I-Cond air-conditioning units installed in EMUs 05 and 06. On the other hand, PNR is currently in the process of procuring 15 air-conditioning units for the coaches.

PNR procured polycarbonate panels from BT Industries Incorporated through public bidding in 2019 to replace the old windows of the 203 Series. The contract also covered the replacement of the windows of the Hyundai Rotem DMU, KiHa 350, KiHa 52, and the KiHa 59 (KoGaNe) trains. Replacement of windows was conducted in 2020, with EMU 05 as the first set to have new fitted windows, removing the need of grills. All four active EMU sets have polycarbonate windows.

In summer of 2020, PNR removed the blue livery of EMUs 04 and 07. The management have stripped off the paint and focus on the bodywork progress of the said EMUs (with some instance of revealing their old livery dating back to their JR incarnation). This in preparation for the new livery of the PNR EMU 203 Series.

As of February 2021, EMUs 04 and 07 still don't have their new livery yet, though they are painted in primer gray.

Key
 KuHa: Former driving trailer car
 SaHa: Former intermediate trailer car
 MoHa 202: Former intermediate motor car
 MoHa 203: Former intermediate motor car with pantograph

Incidents

Japan
On 20 March 1995, the train number A725K, or the Matsudo Train Set Number 67, which later transferred to Philippine National Railways in 2011, was involved on the sarin gas attack which happened on the Tokyo Metro Chiyoda Line alone, southwest-bound section bound for Yoyogi-Uehara station at 7:48 AM,  As the train approached Shin-Ochanomizu Station, the central business district in Chiyoda, one member of the team punctured one of his two bags of sarin, leaving the other untouched, and exited the train at Shin-Ochanomizu. And then finally, the train has been proceeded down the line with the punctured bag of sarin leaking until 4 stops later at Kasumigaseki Station. There, the bags were removed and eventually disposed of by station attendants, of whom two died. The train continued on to the next station where it was completely stopped, evacuated and cleaned.

Philippines
On 14 January 2018, a passenger in a 203 series trainset forced a train door open while the train was moving.
On 16 February 2020, a 203 series trainset was involved in a stone-throwing incident. It damaged a door window and injured one passenger.
On 12 April 2022, a 9-to-12-year-old child died after being run over by a 900 class locomotive hauling a 203 series EMU train at the intersection of Antipolo Street and Ipil Street in Sta. Cruz, Manila.

References

External links

 

Electric multiple units of Japan
East Japan Railway Company
Jōban Line
Train-related introductions in 1982
Rolling stock of the Philippines
Philippine National Railways
Electric multiple units of Indonesia
Tokyu Car multiple units
Kawasaki multiple units
Kinki Sharyo multiple units
1500 V DC multiple units of Japan